The Witchmaster's Key is Volume 55 in the original The Hardy Boys Mystery Stories published by Grosset & Dunlap.

This book was written for the Stratemeyer Syndicate by Vincent Buranelli in 1976.

Plot summary
In East Anglia, England, Frank and Joe Hardy are investigating one of the unusual cases of their lives, involving burglary, witchcraft, and maybe even kidnapping. Soon they are caught in a battle for their lives against the forces of evil.

References

The Hardy Boys books
1976 American novels
1976 children's books
Novels set in England
Witchcraft in written fiction
Grosset & Dunlap books